Mongiana is a comune (municipality) in the Province of Vibo Valentia in the Italian region Calabria, located about  southwest of Catanzaro and about  southeast of Vibo Valentia.

Mongiana was the seat of the main ironworks and foundries of the Kingdom of Two Sicilies. The Monte Pecoraro, a peak in the Serre Calabresi, is located in its territory.

See also 

Reali ferriere ed Officine di Mongiana

References

 

Cities and towns in Calabria